Matthew Richard Cardarople (born February 9, 1983) is an American actor and comedian. He has appeared in the ABC television series Selfie, the 2015 film Jurassic World, the 2016 TV series Stranger Things, and as the "Henchperson of Indeterminate Gender" in the TV series Lemony Snicket's A Series of Unfortunate Events. In 2021, he played Keith in the film Free Guy. His supporting roles include appearances in Michael Showalter's 2017 romantic comedy The Big Sick, and Sterlin Harjo and Taika Waititi's TV series Reservation Dogs, set in an Indigenous community in Oklahoma.

Early life and education

Cardarople was born in Exeter, New Hampshire. His parents divorced when he was 
young. He is a graduate of New York Film Academy, after which he worked as a personal assistant for Luke Wilson.

Cardarople studied acting at The Beverly Hills Playhouse. He studied with Lesly Kahn. His career began with features in the films Blonde Ambition and Drillbit Taylor. He was discovered by Luke and Owen Wilson.

He starred as a recurring guest on ABC’s Selfie. He appeared regularly in Netflix's adaptation of A Series of Unfortunate Events, which premiered in 2017.

Career
He has also appeared in the movies Jurassic World and Dumb and Dumber To. His credits include roles in the indie comedy The 4th, The Big Sick, the Steven Soderbergh-directed film Logan Lucky and other films such as Itsy Bitsy and I am Woman.

On Television, Cardarople has appeared on shows such as NCIS: LA, New Girl, NCIS: Naval Criminal Investigative Service, Angie Tribeca, Scrubs, Ray Donovan, You're The Worst, Comedy Bang! Bang!, Selfie and Chasing Life.

Cardarople played Count Olaf's "Henchperson of Indeterminate Gender” in A Series of Unfortunate Events on Netflix.

Filmography

Film

Television

References

External links
 

1983 births
21st-century American male actors
American male film actors
American male television actors
Living people
Male actors from New Hampshire
People from Exeter, New Hampshire